William John Morris (born June 26, 1949) is a Canadian former professional ice hockey player.

Career 
Morris began his career with the Long Island Ducks. He was also a member of the Winston-Salem Polar Twins. During the 1974–75 season, Morris played 36 games in the World Hockey Association with the Edmonton Oilers.

Personal life 
Morris's father, Frank Morris, played in the Canadian Football League.

References

External links

1949 births
Living people
Canadian ice hockey left wingers
Carolina Thunderbirds players
Edmonton Oilers (WHA) players
Ice hockey people from Toronto
Long Island Ducks (ice hockey) players
Winston-Salem Polar Twins (SHL) players
Winston-Salem Thunderbirds players